Independent Group may refer to:

Independent Group (art movement), a group of artists
Independent Group (Kenya), a defunct political party in Kenya
Independent Group (Solomon Islands), a political faction in the Solomon Islands
Independent Group (Turkey), a former opposition group in the Turkish parliament
Independent Group of Benalmádena, a municipal political party in Benalmádena, Spain
Independent Group of the Condado de Treviño, a municipal political party in Condado de Treviño, Spain
The Independent Group for Change,  a former political party founded and dissolved in 2019 in the United Kingdom

Groups with similar names
Independent Labour Group, a nationalist political party in Northern Ireland, active 1958–1965
Independent Parliamentary Group, a right-wing UK political organisation, active 1920–1921
Labour Independent Group, an organisation of former UK Labour MPs, active 1948–1950
Independent Senate Group (in Dutch: Onafhankelijke SenaatsFractie), a Dutch parliamentary group in the First Chamber of the parliament, since 1995
Technical Group of Independents (disambiguation), two separate groups in the European Parliament, active 1979-84 and 1999-2001
Independents 4 Change, a political group in the Republic of Ireland, formed in 2014
The Independents (UK), a political group in the United Kingdom, formed in July 2019

See also
The Independent (disambiguation)